Center Township is one of twelve townships in Rush County, Indiana. As of the 2010 census, its population was 780 and it contained 316 housing units.

History
Center Township was organized in 1830.

The Center Township Grade and High School, Indiana Soldiers' and Sailors' Children's Home, and Jabez Reeves Farmstead are listed on the National Register of Historic Places.

Geography

Unincorporated towns
 Mays at 
 Sexton at 
 Sulphur Spring at 
(This list is based on USGS data and may include former settlements.)

References

External links
 Indiana Township Association
 United Township Association of Indiana

Townships in Rush County, Indiana
Townships in Indiana